Northern University Bangladesh or NUB is a private university in Dhaka, Bangladesh. It was established in 2002. The university was sponsored and funded by International Business Agriculture & Technology (IUBAT) Trust. Presently known as NUB Trust (NUBT), a registered, non-political, non-profit voluntary organization, NUB made its foray into the field of higher education and established itself as a center for excellence.

History
In 2002, Northern University Bangladesh was established by International Business Agriculture & Technology (IBAT) Trust, a registered, non-political, non-profit voluntary organization, NUB made its foray into the field of higher education and established itself as a center for excellence. Presently Northern University Bangladesh (NUB) has 5 Faculties situated within the Dhaka Metropolitan city with its Permanent Campus near Haji camp at Ashkona, Dakshin Khan. NUB has affiliations & accreditations with international institutions in its effort to provide education that can provide students with all the tools needed to face the challenges in any chosen career from any specialized field & the global industry. NUB has been authorized to confer degrees and certificates in all branches of knowledge including Business, Arts & Humanities, Science and Engineering, Law, Pharmacy and Public Health within the levels that include Bachelors, Masters & is in the process of acquiring the level of M Phil & Ph.D. in collaboration with foreign universities.

Faculties and departments

Faculty of Business
Department of Business Administration
 BBA (Bachelor of Business Administration) 4 years
 MBA (Master of Business Administration) 1–2 years
 MBM (Master of Bank Management) 1–2 years

Faculty of Science and Engineering

Department of Computer Science and Engineering
 B.Sc. in CSE (Computer Science and Engineering) 4-year program

Department of Electronics and Communication Engineering
 B.Sc. in ECE (Electronics and Communication Engineering) 4-year program

Department of Electrical and Electronic Engineering
 B.Sc. in EEE (Electrical and Electronic Engineering) 4-year program
 B.Sc. in EEE (Electrical and Electronic Engineering) 3-year program for Diploma holders
Department of Textile Engineering
 B.Sc. in TE (Textile Engineering) 4-year program
 B.Sc. in EBTX (Textile Engineering)  (Evening) 3 years program

Faculty of Arts & Humanities
Department of English
 B. A. (Hons) in English Language & Literature (4-year program)
 Master of Arts in English (1-2 year program)
 MAEL (Master of Arts in English Language) 1–2 years

Department of Development & Governance Studies
 MGS (Master in Governance Studies) 1-year program

Faculty of Law
Department of Law
 LLB (Bachelor of Laws Hons) 4 years program
 LLM (Master of Laws) 1–2 years program

Faculty of Health Science
Department of Pharmacy
 B.Pharm. (Bachelor of Pharmacy Hons) 4-year program

Department of Public Health
 MPH (Master of Public Health) 1-2 year program

List of vice-chancellors 
 Prof. Dr. Anwar Hossain ( present )

References

External links
 NUB Official website

Educational institutions established in 2002
Private universities in Bangladesh
Universities and colleges in Dhaka
2002 establishments in Bangladesh

See also
List of colleges in Bangladesh
List of universities in Bangladesh
Notre Dame University Bangladesh